Wapowski is a lunar impact crater located on the lunar near side near the southern pole. The crater is located Southwest of craters von Baeyer and Svedberg just inside the rim of the prominent Scott crater. Wapowski was adopted and named after Polish cartographer Bernard Wapowski by the IAU in 2009.

References

External links 
 LAC-144 area — Map of southern lunar pole

Impact craters on the Moon